Electoral district V (Croatian: V. izborna jedinica) is one of twelve electoral districts of Croatian Parliament.

Boundaries  
Electoral district V consist of:

 whole Požega-Slavonia County;
 whole Brod-Posavina County;
 whole Vukovar-Srijem County.

Election

2000 Elections 
 

HDZ
 Vesna Škare-Ožbolt
 Jadranka Kosor
 Josip Sesar
 Juraj Njavro
 Marija Bajt

SDP - HSLS
 Mato Arlović
 Želimir Janjić
 Branislav Tušek
 Dubravka Horvat
 Marko Baričević

HSS - LS - HNS
 Ivo Lončar
 Ljubica Lalić
 Marijan Maršić

HSP - HKDU
 Anto Kovačević

2003 Elections 
 

HDZ
 Petar Čobanković
 Anto Bagarić
 Zdravko Sočković
 Tomislav Čuljak
 Marija Bajt
 Drago Prgomet
 Petar Mlinarić
 Ivica Klem

SDP
 Mato Arlović
 Mato Gavran
 Ljubica Brdarić

HSS
 Ljubica Lalić

HSP
 Vlado Jukić

HSLS - DC
 Vesna Škare-Ožbolt

2007 Elections 
 

HDZ
 Petar Čobanković
 Suzana Bilić Vardić
 Franjo Lucić
 Tomislav Čuljak
 Mato Bilonjić
 Petar Mlinarić
 Davor Huška
 Božo Galić

SDP
 Igor Dragovan
 Zdravko Ronko
 Sonja Šimunović
 Goran Heffer

HDSSB
 Boro Grubišić

HSS - HSLS 
 Zdravko Kelić

2011 Elections 
 

HDZ
 Jadranka Kosor
 Petar Čobanković
 Danijel Marušić
 Franjo Lucić
 Tomislav Čuljak
 Zvonko Milas

SDP - HNS - IDS - HSU
 Igor Dragovan
 Zdravko Ronko
 Željko Sabo
 Josip Vuković
 Ivan Vrdoljak
 Tihomir Jakovina

HDSSB
 Boro Grubišić
 Dražen Đurović

2015 Elections 
 

HDZ - HSS - HSP AS - BUZ - HSLS - HRAST - HDS - ZDS
 Božo Galić
 Stevo Culej
 Danijel Marušić
 Pero Ćosić
 Franjo Lucić
 Tomislav Čuljak
 Marija Budimir
 Pero Ćorić

SDP - HNS - HSU - HL SR - A-HSS - ZS
 Predrag Matić
 Zdravko Ronko
 Tihomir Jakovina
 Marija Ilić

Most
 Tomislav Panenić
 Ivica Mišić

2016 Elections 
 

HDZ
 Zdravko Marić
 Stevo Culej
 Dražen Milinković
 Franjo Lucić
 Pero Ćosić
 Ivan Penava
 Danijel Marušić
 Mladen Karlić

SDP - HNS - HSU - HL SR - A-HSS - ZS
 Zdravko Ronko
 Predrag Matić
 Davor Vlaović
 Marta Luc-Polanc

Most
 Tomislav Panenić

ŽZ - PH - AM
 Ivica Mišić

2020 Elections 
 

HDZ
 Zdravko Marić
 Mario Banožić
 Josip Aladrović
 Pero Ćosić
 Marijana Balić
 Mladen Karlić
 Darko Puljašić
 Danijel Marušić

DP - HS - BLOK - HKS - HRAST - SU - ZL
 Ivan Penava
 Marijan Pavliček
 Ružica Vukovac

SDP - HSS - HSU - SNAGA - GLAS - IDS - PGS
 Predrag Fred Matić
 Vinko Grgić
 Marina Opačak Bilić

References 

Electoral districts in Croatia